Tiiu is an Estonian feminine given name and may refer to:
Tiiu Aro (born 1952), Estonian physician and politician
Tiiu Asper (born 1983), Estonian judoka
Tiiu Erelt (born 1942), Estonian linguist
Tiiu Kera (born 1945), retired United States Air Force major general
Tiiu Kuik (born 1987), Estonian fashion model
Tiiu Kull (born 1958), Estonian botanist
Tiiu Levald (born 1940), Estonian opera singer, pedagogue and music critic
Tiiu Märss (born 1943), Estonian geologist and paleontologist
Tiiu Parmas (1943–2011), Estonian tennis player
Tiiu Nurmberg (born 1982), Canadian-Estonian alpine skier

References

Estonian feminine given names